Adedeji Adeleke (born 6 March 1956) is a Nigerian billionaire, business magnate and president of Adeleke University. He is also the CEO of Pacific Holdings Limited.  He is the father of Davido, a Nigerian musician and Sharon Adeleke. He was married to Dr Vero Adeleke who died on 6 March 2003. His younger brother Ademola Adeleke is the  governor of Osun State.

References

Living people
Place of birth missing (living people)
Nigerian politicians
1957 births
Yoruba businesspeople
Founders of Nigerian schools and colleges
Nigerian business executives
Adeleke family